Lebanon competed at the 2014 Summer Youth Olympics, in Nanjing, China from 16 August to 28 August 2014.

Athletics

Lebanon qualified one athlete.

Qualification Legend: Q=Final A (medal); qB=Final B (non-medal); qC=Final C (non-medal); qD=Final D (non-medal); qE=Final E (non-medal)

Girls
Track & road events

Fencing

Lebanon was given a quota to compete by the tripartite committee.

Boys

Swimming

Lebanon qualified one swimmer.

Girls

Taekwondo

Lebanon was given a wild card to compete.

Boys

References

2014 in Lebanese sport
Nations at the 2014 Summer Youth Olympics
Lebanon at the Youth Olympics